The August Offer was an offer made by Viceroy Linlithgow in 1940 promising the expansion of the Executive Council of the Viceroy of India to include more Indians, the establishment of an advisory war council, giving full weight to minority opinion, and the recognition of Indians' right to frame their own constitution. (after the end of the war). In return, it was hoped that all parties and communities in India would cooperate in Britain's efforts in World War II. However this proposal was rejected by the Congress as the minorities, especially the Muslim League, were assured that no constitutional scheme was acceptable to the government without their agreement, i.e.  providing a veto power to the Muslim League. The Muslim League did not accept the offer, as it did not give a clear assurance for the establishment of Pakistan.

Preface 

A change of government took place in Britain in May 1940 when Winston Churchill became prime minister (1940–45). The Fall of France in June left Britain in immediate danger of Nazi occupation. As the war was taking a menacing turn from the Allied point of view, the Indian National Congress softened its demands and offered to cooperate in the war if a transfer of authority in India was made to an interim government. The British government's response to these demands was a statement delivered by the then Viceroy, Lord Linlithgow, known as the August Offer.

The August Offer 

On 8 August 1940, early in the Battle of Britain, the Viceroy of India, Lord Linlithgow, made the so-called "August Offer" at Simla, a fresh proposal promising the expansion of the Executive Council to include more Indians, the establishment of an advisory war council, giving weight to minority opinion, and the recognition of Indians' right to frame their own constitution (after the end of the war). In return, it was hoped that all parties and communities in India would cooperate in Britain's war effort.

Linlithgow attempted to solve the Congress-Raj stalemate over popular control of India's defense. Linlithgow prefaced his proposal by re-iterating that the differences in ideologies that separated the All India Muslim League and the Indian National Congress must be bridged before any significant constitutional settlement was made. Nevertheless, the Viceroy announced that the British government was now willing to move forward with governmental changes that would "associate Indian public opinion with the conduct of the war."

Linlithgow was authorized to admit a limited number of Indian politicians to his executive council and to establish a war advisory council that included Princes, politicians and other interests in the national life of India. However, Linlithgow warned the politicians that his proposal did not imply that there would be any revision of the 1935 Government of India Act.

The declaration marked an important advance over the existing state of things, as it recognised at least the natural and inherent right of the people of the country to determine the form of their future constitution, and explicitly promised Dominion status.

The following proposals were put in:
 After the war a representative Indian body would be set up to frame a constitution for India.
 Viceroy's Executive Council would be expanded without delay.
 The minorities were assured that the government would not transfer power "to any system of government whose authority is directly denied by large and powerful elements in Indian national life."

Political reception 

The Congress trusted the intentions of the British government. Consequently, Linlithgow recorded that the British government "could contemplate the transfer of their present responsibilities for the peace and tranquility of India to any system of Government whose authority is directly denied by large and power elements in the India’s national life." Moreover, as the British Empire was pre-engaged in their war against the Germans totalitarianism, the period was unpropitious for addressing congressional issues in India. Therefore, Linlithgow stated that the constitutional future of India could be resolved in the future once the war was over by establishing a constituent assembly that was representative of the principal elements in India's national life. The Congress Working Committee meeting at Wardha on  21 August 1940 eventually rejected the offer, and asserted its demand for complete freedom from the imperial power. Gandhi viewed it as having widened the gulf between Nationalist India and the British ruler.

Having not taken the Pakistan idea seriously, Linlithgow supposed that what Jinnah actually wanted was a non-federal arrangement without Hindu domination. To allay Muslim fears of Hindu domination the 'August offer' had been accompanied with the promise that a future constitution would take the views of minorities into consideration. The Muslim League was not satisfied with Linlithgow's offer and rejected it in September.

Individual Satyagraha 1940-41 

The Congress was in a confused state again after the August Offer. The radicals and leftists wanted to launch a mass Civil Disobedience Movement, but here Gandhi insisted on Individual Satyagraha. The Individual Satyagraha was not to seek independence but to affirm the right of speech. The other reason for this Satyagraha was that a mass movement might turn violent and he would not like to see the Great Britain embarrassed by such a situation. This view was conveyed to Lord Linlithgow by Gandhi when he met him on 27 September 1940. The non-violence was set as the centerpiece of Individual Satyagraha. This was done by carefully selecting the Satyagrahis. The first Satyagrahi selected was Acharya Vinoba Bhave(bhoodan movement), who was sent to Jail when he spoke against the war. He was followed nearly by 25,000 individual satyagrahis. The second Satyagrahi was Jawahar Lal Nehru. The third was Brahma Datt, one of the inmates of the Gandhi's Ashram. They all were sent to jail for violating the Defence of India Act, and many others were also later imprisoned. But since it was not a mass movement, it attracted little enthusiasm and in December 1940, Gandhi suspended it. The campaign started again in January 1941; this time thousands of people joined and around 20,000 people were arrested.

Significant modifications were subsequently made to the August Offer in 1942 in the form of the Cripps Proposals.

References

Further reading 
 August Offer: India's Constitution

India in World War II
1940 in India
Military history of British India
Indian independence movement